Round 1 of the 2013 Blancpain Endurance Series season took place at Monza, Italy on 14 April 2013. A field of 60 GT3 cars competed in the 3-hour endurance race. The race was won by the Ferrari 458 Italia GT3 of Kessel Racing, driven by Daniel Zampieri, César Ramos and Davide Rigon.

Official results 
Class winners in bold.  Cars failing to complete 70% of winner's distance marked as Not Classified (NC).

References
2013 Blancpain Endurance Series Round 1 Monza results

Monza
Blancpain Endurance Series